Frank Komenda (November 25, 1934 – November 15, 2010) was an American politician who served in the Maryland House of Delegates from the 27th district from 1975 to 1983 and in the Maryland Senate from the 26th district from 1983 to 1991.

He died on November 15, 2010, in Annapolis, Maryland at age 75.

References

1934 births
2010 deaths
Democratic Party members of the Maryland House of Delegates
Democratic Party Maryland state senators